Gheorghe Gajion (born 13 November 1992) affectionately known by fans as The Beast From The East is a Moldovan rugby union player who plays for the Ospreys and Bridgend Ravens as a prop. He is also a Moldovan international.

Gajion joined the Ospreys in 2018 having previously played for Rugby Rovigo in Italy and Trelissac in France.

Gajoin returns to France to play for Pro D2 Aurillac for the 2020–21 season.

References

External links 
itsrugby Profile

Moldovan rugby union players
Romanian rugby union players
Ospreys (rugby union) players
Living people
1992 births
Rugby Rovigo Delta players
Stade Aurillacois Cantal Auvergne players
Rugby union props